Verbena Heights is a Flat-for-Sale Scheme public housing estate in Po Lam, Tseung Kwan O, New Territories, Hong Kong located on reclaimed land near MTR Po Lam station. It now consists of seven residential buildings with a total of 1894 saleable units and 971 rental units, built between 1996 and 1997 by Hong Kong Housing Society. It is an attempt to design environmentally-responsible housing. It received a Silver Medal at the 1998 Hong Kong Institute of Architects Annual Awards.

Demographics
According to the 2016 by-census, Verbena Heights had a population of 6,661. The median age was 48.9 and the majority of residents (96 per cent) were of Chinese ethnicity. The average household size was 2.4 people. The median monthly household income of all households (i.e. including both economically active and inactive households) was HK$29,500.

Politics
Verbena Heights is located in Wai Yan constituency of the Sai Kung District Council. It was formerly represented by Chun Hoi-shing, who was elected in the 2019 elections until July 2021.

See also

Public housing estates in Tseung Kwan O

References

Public housing estates in Hong Kong
Flat-for-Sale Scheme
Po Lam
Residential buildings completed in 1996
Residential buildings completed in 1997